Firuz Salar (also Romanized as Fīrūz Sālār) is a village in Dastjerd Rural District of Gugan District, Azarshahr County, East Azerbaijan province, Iran. At the 2006 census, its population was 2,405 in 626 households. The following census in 2011 counted 2,924 people in 869 households. The latest census in 2016 showed a population of 2,582 people in 839 households; it was the largest village in its rural district.

References 

Azarshahr County

Populated places in East Azerbaijan Province

Populated places in Azarshahr County